Redditch Borough Council elections are held three years out of every four, with a third of the council elected each time. Redditch Borough Council is the local authority for the non-metropolitan district of Redditch in Worcestershire, England. Since the last boundary changes in 2004, 29 councillors are elected from 12 wards.

Political control
From 1894 to 1974 the town of Redditch was governed by an urban district council. Under the Local Government Act 1972 Redditch became a non-metropolitan district, retaining the same boundaries as the old urban district, but with significantly different powers. The first elections to the new council were held in 1973, initially operating as a shadow authority before coming into its powers on 1 April 1974. Political control of the council since 1974 has been held by the following parties:

Leadership
The leaders of the council since 2008 have been:

Council elections
1973 Redditch District Council election
1976 Redditch District Council election
1979 Redditch District Council election
1983 Redditch Borough Council election (New ward boundaries)
1984 Redditch Borough Council election
1986 Redditch Borough Council election
1987 Redditch Borough Council election
1988 Redditch Borough Council election
1990 Redditch Borough Council election
1991 Redditch Borough Council election
1992 Redditch Borough Council election
1994 Redditch Borough Council election (Borough boundary changes took place but the number of seats remained the same)
1995 Redditch Borough Council election
1996 Redditch Borough Council election
1998 Redditch Borough Council election
1999 Redditch Borough Council election
2000 Redditch Borough Council election
2002 Redditch Borough Council election
2003 Redditch Borough Council election
2004 Redditch Borough Council election (New ward boundaries)
2006 Redditch Borough Council election
2007 Redditch Borough Council election
2008 Redditch Borough Council election
2010 Redditch Borough Council election
2011 Redditch Borough Council election
2012 Redditch Borough Council election
2014 Redditch Borough Council election
2015 Redditch Borough Council election
2016 Redditch Borough Council election
2018 Redditch Borough Council election
2019 Redditch Borough Council election
2021 Redditch Borough Council election
2022 Redditch Borough Council election

By-election results

1973-1996

1997-2007

2008-2018

2019-2029

References

Redditch election results
By-election results

External links
Redditch Borough Council 

 
Redditch
Local government in Worcestershire
Council elections in Worcestershire
District council elections in England
Council elections in Hereford and Worcester